Slightly over half of the homepages of the most visited websites on the World Wide Web are in English, with varying amounts of information available in many other languages. Other top languages are Russian, Spanish, Turkish, Persian, French, German and Japanese.

Of the more than 7,000 existing languages, only a few hundred are recognized as being in use for Web pages on the World Wide Web.

Languages used
There is debate over the most-used languages on the Internet. A 2009 UNESCO report monitoring the languages of websites for 12 years, from 1996 to 2008, found a steady year-on-year decline in the percentage of webpages in English, from 75 percent in 1998 to 45 percent in 2005. The authors found that English remained at 45 percent of content for 2005 to the end of the study but believe this was due to the bias of search engines indexing more English-language content rather than a true stabilization of the percentage of content in English on the World Wide Web.

The number of non-English web pages is rapidly expanding. The use of English online increased by around 281 percent from 2001 to 2011, a lower rate of growth than that of Spanish (743 percent), Chinese (1,277 percent), Russian (1,826 percent) or Arabic (2,501 percent) over the same period.

According to a 2000 study, the international auxiliary language Esperanto ranked 40 out of all languages in search engine queries, also ranking 27 out of all languages that rely on the Latin script.

Content languages for websites
W3Techs estimated percentages of the top 10 million websites on the World Wide Web using various content languages as of March 18, 2023:

All other languages are used in less than 0.1% of websites. Even including all languages, percentages may not sum to 100% because some websites contain multiple content languages.

The figures from the W3Techs study are based on the one million most visited websites (i.e., approximately 0.27 percent of all websites according to December 2011 figures) as ranked by Alexa.com, and language is identified using only the home page of the sites in most cases (e.g., all of Wikipedia is based on the language detection of http://www.wikipedia.org). As a consequence, the figures show a significantly higher percentage for many languages (especially for English) as compared to the figures for all websites. The figures for all websites are unknown, but some sources estimate below 50 percent for English; see for instance, Towards a multilingual cyberspace and the 2009 UNESCO report.

Icelandic is among, or the least, used national language on the internet, while Welsh has fewer words on the internet.

Content languages on YouTube

Of the top 250 YouTube channels, 66% of the content is in English, 15% in Spanish, 7% in Portuguese, 5% in Hindi, 2% in Korean, while other languages make up 5%. YouTube is available in over 80 languages with more than a hundred different local versions. Of those popular YouTube channels that posted a video in the first week of 2019, just over half contained some content in a language other than English.

Internet users by language
InternetWorldStats estimates of the number of Internet users by language as of March 31, 2020:

Wikipedia page views by language 

Wikimedia Statistics gives the number of page views of each edition of Wikipedia by language.

See also
 Computer recycling
 Computer technology for developing areas
 English in computing
 Global digital divide
 Great Firewall
 Internationalization and localization
 Internet in China
 Internet in Russia
 Internet censorship and surveillance by country
 Language localisation
 List of countries by number of broadband Internet subscriptions
 List of countries by number of Internet hosts
 List of countries by number of Internet users
 Multilingualism
 Rural internet
 Unicode
 Website localization

References

External links
Internet World Users by Language, Internet World Stats.
"Estimation of English and non-English Language Use on the WWW", Gregory Grefenstette and Julien Nioche, in Proceedings of RIAO'2000, Content-Based Multimedia Information Access, Paris, 12–14 April 2000, pp. 237–246.
World GDP by Language 1975–2002, Mark Davis, Unicode Technical Note #13 (2003).
"Writing the Web’s Future in Many Languages", Daniel Sorid, New York Times, 30 December 2008.
Statistical Survey Report on Internet Usage in China, China Internet Network Information Center (2009), English translation.
List of CNNIC statistical reports, China Internet Network Information Center (1997-2010).
Measuring Linguistic Diversity on the Internet, UNESCO (2006).
Twelve years of measuring linguistic diversity in the Internet, UNESCO (2009).
Language Observatory, Japan Science and Technology Agency (2012).
Observatory of linguistic and cultural diversity on the Internet, FUNREDES/MAAYA

Internet-related lists
Internet culture
Population statistics
Internet